The England national kabbadi team was established in 1992 and represents England in the National Kabaddi Association. The team is also affiliated with the International Kabaddi Association. In the 2004 Kabaddi World Cup, which was the inaugural Kabaddi World Cup tournament, the team reached the quarter-finals following wins against Malaysia and South Korea and a loss against Japan, where they lost to Canada. The team has participated in the group phases of the 2007, 2010, 2011 and 2012 Kabaddi World Cup tournaments, but did not qualify for the semi-finals.

References

External links
England Kabaddi

Kabaddi
National kabaddi teams
1992 establishments in England
National kabaddi team